Austromyrtus dulcis is a species of plant native to eastern Australia. it grows as a small spreading shrub and is easily recognised by its characteristic berries that usually ripen in summer and autumn. Common names include the midgen berry, midyim, and silky myrtle.

Description
Austromyrtus dulcis is a small spreading shrub;  in height. The leaves are 1–3 cm long and 0.5 cm wide, opposite, lanceolate to elliptical, glossy above with silky hairs beneath. The small white flowers are 7-10 mm in length, they have five petals and a large number of sepals, they are then followed by dotted mauve sweet edible berries which ripen in summer and autumn and contain three to nine pale brown seeds.

Distribution and habitat
The species occurs in New South Wales and Queensland, from Grafton to Fraser Island. It occurs as a common understorey plant of heathland and woodlands and also growing on sandy soils and occasionally on the margins of rainforests.

Uses
The berries are a popular traditional bushfood, eaten by indigenous Australians and non-indigenous people. The melt-in-the-mouth berries are sweet and aromatic, with a pleasant peppery/gingery flavour. While recognized as having good flavour qualities, the berries have not been commercialized due to harvesting and handling issues.

Midgim is also popular in amenity horticulture as an adaptable shrub for a variety of situations, handling a range of soils and climatic conditions.

See also
Ugni molinae
Syzygium australe
Eremophila debilis
Billardiera scandens
Enchylaena tomentosa
Solanum aviculare
Backhousia citriodora
Smilax glyciphylla

References

Flora of New South Wales
Flora of Queensland
dulcis
Bushfood
Myrtales of Australia